Baltiysky District is an administrative district (raion), one of the fifteen in Kaliningrad Oblast, Russia. As a municipal division, it is incorporated as Baltiysky Municipal District. Its administrative center is the town of Baltiysk, which accounts for 90.7% of the district's total population of  It is the westernmost district in Russia, with the abandoned village of Narmeln being the westernmost point.

Baltiysky District is located on the Sambia Peninsula in the west of the oblast along the Baltic Sea coast, and partially forms the Vistula Lagoon. Baltiysky District shares a border with Zelenogradsky District in the north, and an international border with Poland in the south.

References

Notes

Sources

Districts of Kaliningrad Oblast